Drhovy is a municipality and village in Příbram District in the Central Bohemian Region of the Czech Republic. It has about 300 inhabitants.

Administrative parts
The village of Homole is an administrative part of Drhovy.

References

Villages in Příbram District